Arlis Shala (born 26 July 2000) is an Albanian professional footballer who plays as a goalkeeper for Kosovan club KF Drenica.

Club career

Early career
Shala at the age of 10, he started playing football in Teuta Durrës. On 4 February 2017, in an interview for Panorama Sport he confirmed that is in the test at youth club of French club Angers, but unfortunately this test turned out to fail. One year later, he was transferred to Italian club Cesena Berretti. Shala was also part of the Albanian senior clubs like Besa Kavajë (January–July 2019), Laçi (July–August 2019) and Flamurtari (August 2019–January 2020), but unfortunately he was unable to make his debut.

Luftëtari
In early January 2020, Shala joined Kategoria Superiore side Luftëtari, to replace the departed Panagiotis Paiteris as the second choice. On 31 January 2020, Albanian Football Association confirmed that he had joined as permanent transfer of Luftëtari, after FIFA unlocked the transfer window of Luftëtari that it was blocked due to debt problems. Two days later, Shala made his debut in a 0–3 home defeat against Partizani Tirana after being named in the starting line-up.

Llapi
On 12 August 2020, Shala signed a three-year contract with Football Superleague of Kosovo club Llapi.

International career
On 29 July 2016, Shala was named as part of the Albania U17 squad for 2016 Kazakhstan President Cup. On 11 August 2016, he made his debut with Albania U17 in a group stage match of 2016 Kazakhstan President Cup against Kazakhstan U17 after coming on as a substitute at last minutes in place of Ilia Sinani.

References

External links

2000 births
Living people
Footballers from Durrës
Albanian footballers
Albania youth international footballers
Albanian expatriate footballers
Albanian expatriate sportspeople in Italy
Albanian expatriate sportspeople in Kosovo
Association football goalkeepers
Kategoria e Parë players
Besa Kavajë players
Kategoria Superiore players
KF Laçi players
Flamurtari Vlorë players
Luftëtari Gjirokastër players
Football Superleague of Kosovo players
KF Llapi players